is a passenger railway station in located in the town of Kihoku, Kitamuro District, Mie Prefecture, Japan, operated by Central Japan Railway Company (JR Tōkai).

Lines
Minose Station is served by the Kisei Main Line, and is located 105.9 rail kilometers from the terminus of the line at Kameyama Station.

Station layout
The station consists of two opposed side platforms connected to the station building by a footbridge. The wooden station building dates from the original construction.

Platforms

History 
Minose Station opened on 26 April 1932 on the Japanese Government Railways (JGR) Kisei East Line. The line was extended to Owase Station by 19 December 1934, and the JGR became the Japan National Railways (JNR) after World War II. The line was renamed the Kisei Main Line on 15 July 1959. The station has been unattended since 21 December 1983. The station was absorbed into the JR Central network upon the privatization of the JNR on 1 April 1987.

Passenger statistics
In fiscal 2019, the station was used by an average of 29 passengers daily (boarding passengers only).

Surrounding area
Kihoku Town Hall Minose Branch Office
Kihoku Town Miura Elementary School
Kaizo-ji

See also
List of railway stations in Japan

References

External links

 JR Central timetable 

Railway stations in Japan opened in 1932
Railway stations in Mie Prefecture
Kihoku, Mie